The 2020 Top League was the 17th season of Japan's top tier domestic rugby union competition. The season was initially suspended after round six and then further cancelled due to the COVID-19 pandemic in Japan.

Teams

Standings

Fixtures & Results

Round 1

Round 2

Round 3

Round 4

Round 5

Round 6

References

Japan Rugby League One
Top League